The 1939 Manhattan Jaspers football team was an American football team that represented Manhattan College as an independent during the 1939 college football season.  In its second season under head coach Herb Kopf, the team compiled a 4–4 record and outscored opponents by a total of 165 to 155.

Schedule

References

Manhattan
Manhattan Jaspers football seasons
Manhattan Jaspers football